Buyla Push (also Romanized as Būylā Pūsh; also known as Pīleh Pūsh) is a village in Rahal Rural District, in the Central District of Khoy County, West Azerbaijan Province, Iran. At the 2006 census, its population was 238, in 40 families.

References 

Populated places in Khoy County